Rineloricaria malabarbai is a species of catfish in the family Loricariidae. It is native to South America, where it occurs in the basins of the Jacuí River and the Camaquã River in Brazil. It is typically found in environments with slow to fast water flow, clear to brown water, and rocky substrates. The species reaches 10.2 cm (4 inches) in standard length and is believed to be a facultative air-breather. Its specific name honors Luiz Roberto Malabarba for his contributions to the ichthyology of the Neotropical realm.

References 

Loricariidae
Freshwater fish of Brazil
Fish described in 2008
Catfish of South America